The 1998 All-Ireland Intermediate Hurling Championship was the 15th staging of the All-Ireland hurling championship. The championship ended on 10 October 1998.

Cork were the defending champions, however, they were defeated in the provincial championship. Limerick won the title after defeating Kilkenny by 4-16 to 2-17 in the final.

External links
 Rolls of honour

Intermediate
All-Ireland Intermediate Hurling Championship